Borovan is a village in northwestern Bulgaria, part of Vratsa Province. It is the administrative centre of Borovan municipality, which lies in the central part of Vratsa Province. Borovan is located 150 kilometres north-northeast of the capital Sofia.

Municipality
Borovan municipality has an area of 212 square kilometres and includes the following 5 places:

The population is mostly Bulgarian, with a sizable Roma minority.

Honour
Borovan Knoll on Graham Land in Antarctica is named after Borovan.

External links
 Borovan municipality website 

Villages in Vratsa Province